Tamirace Fakhoury is a Lebanese writer and academic born in Beit Chabab, Mount Lebanon.

Biography
Born on November 28, 1975, Tamirace published her first poetry book The country of the Emperor and the Lost Child at the age of nine. Then, throughout the years, she published four poetry books in French at Dar An Nahar, Beirut. (Aubades, 1996 ; Contre-marées, 2000 ; Poème absent, 2004; Hémisphères, 2008). Her poems are published in various Arab and Francophone journals in Lebanon, Europe and Canada.

Selected for Les Belles Étrangères in France in 2007, Tamirace writes poetry that captures the fragmentation of geography and identity in post-war societies.

Tamirace holds a Ph.D. in Political Sciences from the University of Freiburg in Germany. She completed a research fellowship at the European University Institute in Florence, Italy. She was also a visiting scholar at the University of California campus located in Berkeley, California. Tamirace earned the Alexander von Humboldt Fellowship in 2014 at the German Institute of International and Area Studies in Hamburg, Germany. She is currently a professor at the Lebanese American University in Byblos, Lebanon.

Bibliography 
 Tamirace Fakhoury, in Anthologie poétique francophone de voix féminines contemporaines, eds. Sabine Huynh, Andrée Lacelle, Angèle Paoli and Aurélie Tourniaire, Préface de Déborah Heissle, Voix d'encre, 2012
 Tamirace Fakhoury, in Douze écrivains libanais, Les Belles Étrangères, anthologie, Gallimard, verticales/phase deux, 2007.
 Tamirace Fakhoury, Hémisphères, éd. Dar An-Nahar, Beirut, 2008.
 Tamirace Fakhoury Poème absent, éd. Dar An-Nahar, 2004.
 Tamirace Fakhoury Contre-marées, éd. Dar-An-Nahar, 2000.
 Tamirace Fakhoury, Aubades, éd. Dar-An-Nahar, 1996.
 Tamirace Fakhoury, Le pays de l’Empereur et l’Enfant perdu, 1984.

Selected publications in journals 

 "Les Trois Temps", Arcade 64, Fall 2005, Canada
 "Poètes de service", La Page Blanche 36, September 2005, France 
 "Textes poétiques », Exit 33, November 2003, Canada
 "Textes poétiques", 3Journal, March 2004, Schreibzentrum, Ph-Freiburg, Germany
 "La nuit ne s’ouvre que de l’intérieur", Les Hommes Sans Epaules, Cahiers littéraires 13/14, premier semestre 2003, France
 "Poèmes", Poésie Première 22, winter 2002, France
 "Poésies Vagabondages", Poésie 1 Le Cherche-Midi Editeur 28, December 2001, France 
 "Dossier spécial sur la poésie libanaise", Supérieur Inconnu 13, January 1999, France

Selected poetry appearances 
 
 July 2001:  Festival de Lodeve, France
 December 2006:  Journées d’encre et d’exil, Centre Pompidou, Paris, France
 March 2007: Salon du livre Paris, Poéme absent, France.
 November 2007: Les Belles Etrangères, Paris, Bordeaux, Versailles, Marseille, Corsica, and Nantes, France.
 March 2008: Printemps des poètes, Versailles, France.
 April 2008: Printemps des poètes, Fiesole, Italy.
 September 2008: Centre Francois Mauriac, Malagar, Bordeaux in France. 
 March 2009: Salon du livre, Paris, Hémisphères, France. 
 March 2010: Festival Déclamons, "Café littéraire et intervention" at the University of Rennes 2 organized by "la Maison de poésie" in Rennes, France. 
 April 2010: Journées du Liban à Eu, Normandy, France 
 June 2010: festival de poésie, Genoa, Italy.
 March 2011: Reading at kaleidoscope, San Francisco, United States.
 June 2011: Versailles, Paris, France.
 July 2011: Voce Lontane Voce sorelle, Florence, Italy.
 November 2011: Beyrouth, Le salon du livre, recital poetique, leitmotif with Rita Bassil and Michele Gharios, Lebanon.
 December 2011: 300th celebration, Versailles, Paris, France.

References

External links
 Centre international de poésie Marseille - Poem reading audio
 "Que vive la poésie", L'Express. 
  Daniéle Issa-Sayegh, Nouvelles Études Francophones 25, 1 (printemps 2010), pp. 272–274

Living people
Year of birth missing (living people)
21st-century Lebanese poets
Academic staff of Lebanese University
University of Freiburg alumni
Lebanese women poets
21st-century Lebanese women writers